Leo Ilmo Honkala (8 January 1933 – 17 May 2015) was a flyweight Greco-Roman wrestler from Finland who won a bronze medal at the 1952 Summer Olympics. In the following several years he suffered several shoulder injuries, and retired from competitions in 1956 after winning his only national title. In retirement he first worked as a policeman in Finland, but in the late 1960s immigrated to Sweden, and in 1974–85 trained the Swedish wrestling  team. He also competed in powerlifting, but at the 2006 European Masters Championships failed a drug test for EPO and was banned for life.

References

1933 births
2015 deaths
Olympic wrestlers of Finland
Wrestlers at the 1952 Summer Olympics
Finnish male sport wrestlers
Olympic bronze medalists for Finland
Sportspeople from Oulu
Olympic medalists in wrestling
Medalists at the 1952 Summer Olympics
Finnish expatriate sportspeople in Sweden
20th-century Finnish people
21st-century Finnish people